Greece participated in the Eurovision Song Contest 2016 with the song "Utopian Land" written by Vladimiros Sofianidis and performed by the band Argo. The song was internally selected by the Greek broadcaster Hellenic Broadcasting Corporation (ERT) to represent Greece at the 2016 contest in Stockholm, Sweden. Argo were announced as the Greek representatives in February 2016, a month before their song "Utopian Land" was presented.

To promote the entry, a music video for "Utopian Land" was released and Argo performed the song at the INFE Greece Eurovision Party in Athens. Greece was drawn to compete in the first semi-final of the Eurovision Song Contest which took place on 10 May 2016. Performing during the show in position 2, "Utopian Land" was not announced among the top 10 entries of the first semi-final and therefore did not qualify to compete in the final. It was later revealed that Greece placed 16th out of the 18 participating countries in the semi-final with 44 points.

Background 

Between 2004 and 2011, the nation achieved eight consecutive top ten placements in the final. In , Greece placed 19th in the final with the song "One Last Breath" performed by Maria Elena Kyriakou.

The Greek national broadcaster, Hellenic Broadcasting Corporation (ERT), broadcasts the event within Greece and organises the selection process for the nation's entry. ERT had been in charge of Greece's participation in the contest since their debut in 1974 until 2013, when the broadcaster was shut down by a government directive and replaced with the interim Dimosia Tileorasi (DT) and later by the New Hellenic Radio, Internet and Television (NERIT) broadcaster. On 28 April 2015, a legislative proposal that resulted in the renaming of NERIT to ERT was approved and signed into law by the Hellenic Parliament; ERT began broadcasting once again on 11 June. ERT then confirmed Greece's intentions to participate at the Eurovision Song Contest 2016 on 28 August 2015.

For the three contests preceding 2016, television channel MAD TV had organised a national final to select the entry for Greece. For the 2016 contest, however, ERT regained the role of deciding the entry, opting for an internal selection. This was the first time since 2004 that Greece did not use a national final to select their artist and/or song.

Before Eurovision

Internal selection 
On 2 February 2016, ERT announced that they would be selecting Greece's act and song internally. A week later on 9 February 2016, they issued a press release that confirmed the band Argo (formerly known as Europond) as the Greek representatives for the 2016 contest. Argo consisted of six members at the time of the announcement: Christina Lachana, Maria Venetikidou, Vladimiros Sofianidis, Kostas Topouzis, Ilias Kesidis and Alekos Papadopoulos. Prior to selecting Argo, ERT had also approached other artists including Mariza Rizou, Irene Skylakaki and Eleonora Zouganeli.

The song that Argo participated with in the Eurovision Song Contest, "Utopian Land", was presented on 10 March 2016 through a televised press conference and radio premiere. It was presented via three of Hellenic Radio's stations: ERA 1, ERA 2 and KOSMOS. The press conference was held at Hellenic Radio's Studio E at the House of Radio in Athens and was televised during the ERT1 programme Studio 3, hosted by Marilena Katsimi and Silas Seraphim. In regards to the song, ERT director Dionisis Tsaknis stated: "The song has strong ethnic and Balkan sounds, but not in a traditional way. It's an exciting song in Greek, bringing the country's own identity to the contest. The lyrics will refer to the refugee crisis and the financial difficulties we are facing, but the song is really happy and upbeat."  "Utopian Land", which was written by Argo band member Vladimiros Sofianidis, contains lyrics in English and Greek including phrases in the Pontic Greek dialect.

Promotion
To promote "Utopian Land", the official music video, produced by Beetroot productions and filmed in Thessaloniki, was screened on 10 March 2016 at the time of the song's reveal. A re-edited version of the video, adding shots of the song's singers, was later released in early May. To further promote the entry, the group performed live at the INFE Greece Eurovision Party in Athens where they were joined by the likes of Constantinos Christoforou, Barrice and RiskyKidd. They then spoke to Alpha TV responding to criticism their song had received from the public.

At Eurovision 

The Eurovision Song Contest 2016 took place at Globe Arena in Stockholm, Sweden. It consisted of two semi-finals held on 10 and 12 May, respectively, and the final on 14 May 2016. The EBU split up the competing countries into six different pots based on voting patterns from previous contests, with the goal of reducing the amount of neighbourly voting. On 25 January 2016, an allocation draw was held which placed each country into one of the two semi-finals and determined which half of the show they would perform in. Greece was placed into the first semi-final, held on 10 May 2016, and was scheduled to perform in the first half of the show.

Once all the competing songs for the 2016 contest had been released, the running order for the semi-finals was decided by the shows' producers rather than through another draw, so that similar songs were not placed next to each other. Greece was set to perform second, following the entry from Finland and before the entry from Moldova. The two semi-finals and the final were televised in Greece on ERT1 and ERT HD, via radio on ERA 2 and Voice of Greece and online via www.ert.gr, all with commentary by Maria Kozakou and Giorgos Kapoutzidis.

Performances

Argo took part in technical rehearsals on 2 and 6 May 2016, followed by dress rehearsals on 9 and 10 May. This included the jury show on 9 May where the professional juries of each country watched and voted on the competing entries. Heading into the first semi-final, CNN reported that bookmakers and polls ranked the entry 34th of the 42 entries, indicating a likely non-qualification to the final.

The Greek performance featured five of the members of Argo performing together on stage with a male dancer; the female members were dressed in white outfits, while the male members were dressed in white shirts and light brown baggy trousers. The performance was choreographed by Maria Lyraraki with lighting design by Konstantinos Garinis and costumes designed by Yiorgos Mesimeris. For the performance, Argo member Elias Kesides was replaced by dancer Vasilis Roxenos.

At the end of the show, Greece was not announced among the top 10 entries in the first semi-final and therefore failed to qualify to compete in the final. It was later revealed that Greece placed 16th in the semi-final, receiving a total of 44 points: 22 points from the televoting and 22 points from the juries. This marked the first time that Greece failed to qualify to the final since the introduction of semi-finals in 2004, and the first time that the nation was absent from a final since 2000. In response to the result, Greece's Star Channel wrote that most Greeks were not surprised since they never really supported its selection in the first place. Following continued criticism of the entry's result specifically blaming Tsaknis for Argo's selection, ERT's CEO Lambis Tagmatarchis released a statement defending Tsaknis, pointing out that it was a collective decision to send them and that Argo deserves "congratulations for their effort".

Voting

Voting during the three shows was conducted under a new system that involved each country now awarding two sets of points from 1-8, 10 and 12: one from their professional jury and the other from televoting. Each nation's jury consisted of five music industry professionals who are citizens of the country they represent, with their names published before the contest to ensure transparency. This jury judged each entry based on: vocal capacity; the stage performance; the song's composition and originality; and the overall impression by the act. In addition, no member of a national jury was permitted to be connected in any way to any of the competing acts in such a way that they cannot vote impartially and independently. The individual rankings of each jury member as well as the nation's televoting results were released shortly after the final. The Greek spokesperson, who announced the top 12-point score awarded by the Greek jury during the final, was Constantinos Christoforou, who previously represented Cyprus in the Eurovision Song Contest as a solo artist in 1996 and 2005 as well as in 2002 as part of the boy band One. Greece received its only top 12-point score from Cyprus' televote, while the nation awarded its 12 points to Cyprus  through televote and Russia through jury in both the first semi-final and final. The tables below visualise a complete breakdown of points awarded to Greece in the first semi-final, as well as by the country in both the first semi-final and final of the Eurovision Song Contest 2016.

Points awarded to Greece

Points awarded by Greece

Detailed voting results
The following members comprised the Greek jury:
 Mariza Fakli (jury chairperson)artists' public relations
 Lambros Konstantarasradio producer, journalist
 Christiana Stamateloujournalist, music producer
 Georgios Segredakiscurator stage presence, costume designer
 singer

References

External links

 Official ERT Eurovision site

2016
Countries in the Eurovision Song Contest 2016
Eurovision